The Korea Institute for Advanced Study (KIAS) is an advanced research institute in South Korea. It is located on a  campus in Dongdaemun-gu, Seoul.

KIAS was founded in 1996, aiming to become a world leading research institute where international elite scholars gather and dedicate to fundamental research in basic sciences. Currently, there are three schools in the institute: mathematics, physics, and computational sciences. As of 2016, the institute has 3 distinguished professors, 26 professors, and 133 research fellows.

As its name suggests, the institute was modeled after the Institute for Advanced Study in Princeton, New Jersey, USA. KIAS is funded by the government and is a subordinate institute of KAIST.

Presidents 
 1st and 2nd: Kim Chung Wook
 3rd: Kim Mahn Won
 4th: Hyo Chul Myung
 5th: Kim Doochul
 6th: Keum Jonghae
 7th: Lee Yong-hee
 8th: Choe Jaigyoung

See also 
Institute for Basic Science

Notes

External links
  (English and Korean)

Research institutes in South Korea
Dongdaemun District
1996 establishments in South Korea
Mathematical institutes
Physics institutes